With Jeff is a Canadian drama film, directed by Marie-Ève Juste and released in 2012. The film stars Laury Verdieu as Nydia, a shy, quiet Haitian Canadian student leading a regimented and isolated life, who gains a taste of freedom when she accepts a motorcycle ride from her classmate Jeff (Liridon Rashiti).

The film premiered in the Director's Fortnight at the 2012 Cannes Film Festival, and had its Canadian premiere in the Short Cuts program at the 2012 Toronto International Film Festival.

The film received a Prix Jutra nomination for Best Short Film at the 15th Jutra Awards in 2013.

References

External links

2012 films
Quebec films
Black Canadian films
2012 short films
2010s French-language films
French-language Canadian films
Canadian drama short films
2010s Canadian films